Aarset is a Norwegian surname. Notable people with the surname include:

 Eivind Aarset (born 1961), Norwegian jazz guitarist
 John-Ragnar Aarset (born 1973), Norwegian politician

See also
 Årset (disambiguation)

Norwegian-language surnames